Monzambano was a torpedo cruiser of the  built for the Italian Regia Marina (Royal Navy) in the 1880s. The ship was built at the Arsenale di La Spezia, beginning with her keel laying in August 1885 and ending with her completion in August 1889. The ship spent her career in the main Italian fleet conducting training exercises, and did not see action. She spent 1898 patrolling the eastern Mediterranean Sea with the Levant Squadron. Monzambano was withdrawn from service in 1901 and broken up for scrap that year.

Design

She displaced  normally. Her propulsion system consisted of three double-expansion steam engines each driving a single screw propeller, with steam supplied by four coal-fired locomotive boilers. She had a crew of between 105 and 121.

The primary armament for Monzambano was five  torpedo tubes. She carried a light gun battery for defense against torpedo boats. This consisted of six  40-caliber guns, which were mounted singly.

Service history
Monzambano was laid down at the Arsenale di La Spezia on 25 August 1885, the first member of her class to begin construction. She was launched on 14 March 1888 and fitting-out work was completed on 11 August 1889. She served in the attacking squadron during a set of exercises that simulated a French attack on Naples. She remained there through 1894.

In 1895, Monzambano was stationed in the 2nd Maritime Department, split between Taranto and  Naples, along with most of the torpedo cruisers in the Italian fleet. In 1898, Monzambano was assigned to the Levant Squadron that patrolled the eastern Mediterranean. She served on the station with the ironclad battleship , the protected cruiser , Montebello, and the torpedo cruiser . The ship was stricken on 26 August 1901 and broken up for scrap.

Notes

References

External links
 Monzambano Marina Militare website 

Goito-class cruisers
1888 ships
Ships built in La Spezia